All Saints Syro Malabar Church is an Eastern Catholic church belonging to Syro Malabar rite, one of the twenty two Sui iuris eastern rites of the Roman Catholic church. It is located in Koppam Vithura, India. Administratively it comes under the Archdiocese of Changanassery.

History

Syrian Christians in Vithura 
The presence of Syrian Christians in Vithura started when a Jacobite family bought property in 1925. With the establishment of Lakshmi Estate Plantation belonging to the Archieparchy of Tiruvalla, Syrian Christians started arriving as the plantation management staff in Vithura. In the years that followed Syro Malabar Syrian Christian families like Thevarkad, Aayiravelil, Kalappurakkal, Vachaparambil bought land in and around Vithura and started rubber plantations. Members of these families used to attend mass at a makeshift church en route to Peppara where missionary priests from Belgium working in Trivandrum conducted mass for laity belonging to the Roman Catholic Diocese of Quilon. In 1928 the Divine Provindence Latin Catholic church was established in Theviod near Vithura and it became the spiritual center of all catholic families in Vithura. Today this church comes under the Roman Catholic Diocese of Neyyattinkara. In 1980 the Kottayam Diocese of Knanaya Christians established a church in Thottumukku (Ponpara Estate), near Vithura and all Syro Malabar families joined that parish.

C.M.I. Leadership 
A wealthy landlady Kalappurakkal Thressiyama donated 100 acres of land near Vithura to the Carmelites of Mary Immaculate (C.M.I.) for the upkeep of her hospital in Payippad near Changanassery. The C.M.I. priests who thus came to Vithura persuaded the Syro Malabar families to buy land for building a church. A committee was formed under the leadership of George Valiyaveettil, Neelikatt Varkey, Joychan Vazhakkad, Jacob Cherupushpam and Joseph Mannampallil resulting in the purchase of land in Koppam in 1985. A makeshift church was built here and the holy mass was conducted by the C.M.I. priest every Sunday.

Present church 
The present church was built by the C.M.I. order St Joseph province Trivandrum and was consecrated by Arch Bishop Mar Joseph Powathil on March – 28-1987. A cellular cemetery was built in 1988 and the parish hall in 1995. The Friday following Easter is the feast day of all saints and is hence celebrated as the feast day of the church.

Parish vicars

References 

Churches in Thiruvananthapuram district
Syro-Malabar Catholic church buildings
Eastern Catholic churches in Kerala
20th-century Roman Catholic church buildings in India